Mary Gojack (February 19, 1936 – November 12, 1985) was an American politician who served in the Nevada Assembly from 1972 to 1974 and in the Nevada Senate from 1974 to 1978.

She died of cancer on November 12, 1985, in Reno, Nevada at the age of 49.

References

External links
Mary L. Gojack Papers, Special Collections, University Libraries, University of Nevada, Reno.

1936 births
1985 deaths
20th-century American politicians
Democratic Party members of the Nevada Assembly
Democratic Party Nevada state senators